Gourbera is a commune in the Landes department in Nouvelle-Aquitaine in southwestern France.

Population

References

See also
Communes of the Landes department

Communes of Landes (department)